House of Assembly elections were held in Tobago on 9 December 1996 to elect the twelve members of the Tobago House of Assembly. The  governing National Alliance for Reconstruction won ten seats with 60.1% of the vote, while the People's National Movement won one seat with 33.64% of the vote. Independent candidate (and former NAR member) Deborah Moore-Miggins won a seat in Bethel/Patience Hill.

Results

Notes

References

Tobago
Local elections in Trinidad and Tobago
1996 in Trinidad and Tobago